Cara de Ángel is the eighteenth (18th) studio album by Puerto Rican singer Yolandita Monge. It was the singer's first studio album for WEA-Latina and was released in 1992. Once again Venezuelan singer/songwriter Ricardo Montaner was involved in the songwriting of some of the songs.  It includes the radio hits "Sobreviviré", "Entrega Total", "Angel Caído" and the club hit "Viviré Sin Tí".  The album's cover picture was taken by late photographer and stylist Raúl Torres and is a black and white picture, later color painted.

The song "Viviré Sin Tí" was remixed by DJs Pablo Flores and Javier Garza, and became a club hit in Puerto Rico and USA.  This song marked the third consecutive dance club hit for the singer.  Monge filmed very stylish music videos for the tracks "Sobreviviré" and "'Viviré Sin Tí".  The singer also filmed a TV Special performing five of the album's tracks, that aired before the album's release.  Monge performed twelve sold out concerts at Centro de Bellas Artes in 1992 and set a record for any female performer at the venue.

This album features the musical pop tendencies at the time, moving away from the melodramatic lyrics and arrangements of past productions from the 80's. This is also an album that created high expectations because it was her return to music after a temporary hiatus due to her third pregnancy, Imanol Mamery. The album also represents the first release under her new record label WEA-Latina, after 12 years with CBS Records (Sony Music).  Said contract was one of the most lucrative for any Puerto Rican female singer at the time.

The first printing of this album included an alternate version of the title track in place of the song "Angel Caído".  The second printing corrected the "mistake" and included the missing track.  This first printing of the CD is a sought after collector's item to many die hard fans. This album earned Gold, Platinum and Double Platinum status and is currently out of print in all formats.

On April 11, 2020, the singer uploaded on her YouTube channel the song "Abrázame", an unreleased track recorded during these sessions.

Track listing

Credits and personnel

Vocals: Yolandita Monge
Producer: Pablo Manavello
Musical Arrangements: Iker Gastaminza and Pablo Manavello
Additional Production and Remix on "Viviré Sin Tí" by Pablo Flores and Javier Garza for Hits ' n' Mixes Productions
Programming & Keyboards: Iker Gastaminza
Brass Arrangements: Iker Gastaminza and Pablo Manavello
Chorus Arrangements: Pablo Manavello
Guitars: Pablo Manavello
Keyboards on 'Cara De Angel': Léstor Méndez
Guitar Solo on 'Entre Mil Pasos' and 'Cualquiera No': David Lebón
Sax Solo on 'Podrás Decir Te Amo', Entrega Total' and 'Viviré Sin Tí': Ed Calle
Brass: Tony Concepción (trumpet), Ed Calle (sax), Dana Teboe (trombone)

Chorus: Georgina Cruz, Rita Quintero, Mario Inchausti and Willie Pérez Fria
Recorded & Mixed: Black Cat Studio, Miami
Engineer: Keith Morrison
Brass & Vocals Recorded on: Midiland, Miami
Vocal Engineer: Carlos Nieto
Mastering: Bernie Grundman Studios
Assistants: Jim Thomas, Gary Bosko, Riley J. Cornell
Photography and Art Concept: Raúl Torres
Graphic Design: Edwin Crespo
Hair & Make-up: Raúl Torres

Notes

Track listing and credits from album booklet.
Released in Cassette Format on 1992 (77467-4).
Released digitally by ARDC Music Division on November 1, 2017 with the track listing in different order and a revised cover picture.

Track listing (2017 iTunes Version)

Charts

Singles Charts

References

Yolandita Monge albums
1990 albums